Liparis nervosa is a species of orchid found in the Tropics of Asia, Africa and America. It is a terrestrial species that grows in woodlands and grasslands.

Toxicity 
Liparis nervosa contains tumorigenic pyrrolizidine alkaloids.

References

External links 
 

nervosa
Orchids of Asia
Orchids of Africa
Orchids of South America
Orchids of Florida
Flora without expected TNC conservation status